is a Japanese businessman and politician who is the current mayor of Osaka, leader of the Osaka Restoration Association (ORA) and one of the presidents of Nippon Ishin no Kai alongside Nobuyuki Baba.

Early life
Matsui attended public elementary and middle schools in Yao, Osaka, and moved to Fukuoka for high school. After he graduated from Fukuoka Institute of Technology in March 1986, he worked for Kinden, a construction company affiliated with the Kansai Electric Power Company, and Daitu, a privately-held logistics and waste management company.

Political career 
Matsui entered politics in April 2003 when he was elected to the Osaka Prefectural Assembly, serving three consecutive terms. He was a member of the Liberal Democratic Party until 2010, and served in several regional party leadership positions.

Osaka Restoration Association and Japan Restoration Association
In April 2010 Matsui became the first secretary general of the regional Osaka Restoration Association. In September 2012 he also became the founding secretary-general of the new national party, the Japan Restoration Association.

Governor of Osaka
After Tōru Hashimoto decided to step down as governor of Osaka prefecture in order to run as mayor of Osaka city in an effort to advance his plans of merging the two entities, Matsui ran for the governor position to replace him. Matsui was elected to the post in the November 2011 election.

In June 2012, Kyozo Isohi, a homeless and unemployed man recently released from jail, stabbed two passersby to death in Shinsaibashi with a kitchen knife. Isohi told police that "he was frustrated at having no home and no job prospects, and that he didn’t want to live anymore". Matsui made a controversial remark during a press conference, stating the attacker should have just killed himself instead of harming others.

Matsui was re-elected to a second term in the Osaka "double election" of November 2015, scoring an overwhelming victory over his challengers.

Mayor of Osaka 
In 2019 Osaka mayoral election, Matsui defeated his opponent, Akira Yanagimoto, and was elected 21st Mayor of Osaka. This is the second person who has experience as governor of Osaka Prefecture to become the mayor of Osaka, after Toru Hashimoto. In addition, it is the first time since Kunio Hiramatsu that a person who has worked in a private company has been appointed Mayor of Osaka. Matsui has announced his planned retirement from politics in April 2023.

Personal life 
Matsui is married with one son and one daughter.

References

External links
 Official website

1964 births
Living people
Japanese anti-communists
Japan Restoration Party politicians
21st-century Japanese politicians
Governors of Osaka
Mayors of Osaka
People from Yao, Osaka
Nippon Ishin no Kai politicians
Fukuoka Institute of Technology alumni
Politicians from Osaka Prefecture